Cathiravelu Sittampalam (13 September 1898 – 3 February 1964) was a Ceylon Tamil civil servant, politician, Member of Parliament and government minister.

Early life and family
Sittampalam was born on 13 September 1898. He was the son of A. Cathiravelu, a proctor and member of the Jaffna Local Board. He was educated at Jaffna Central College and Royal College, Colombo. He won many prizes at Royal College including the English Essay Prize, the De Zoysa Science Prize and the Mathematics Prize. Aged 15 he passed the Senior Cambridge with first class honours and distinction in mathematics. After school Sittampalam joined St. Peter's College, Cambridge on a science scholarship and graduated with a degree in mathematics.

Sittampalam was a member of a distinguished family. His brother C. Ponnambalam and brother-in-law C. Casipillai were Mayors of Jaffna. His uncle A. Canagaratnam was a member of the Legislative Council.  His great-uncle V. Casipillai was a crown proctor and one of the founders of Jaffna Hindu College.

Sittampalam married Kamalambikai. They had four daughters (Devalakshmi, Pushpalakshmi, Yogalakshmi, and Mallikalakshmi) and one son (Arjuna).

Career
Sittampalam was called to the Bar from Middle Temple. He joined the civil service in 1923 and served in various positions including Assistant  Government Agent and District Judge. He later left the civil service and practised as an advocate.

Sittampalam stood as an independent candidate in Mannar at the 1947 parliamentary election. He won the election and entered Parliament. He was persuaded to join the United National Party led government and on 26 September 1947 he was sworn in as Minister of Posts and Telecommunication. He was made Minister of Industries, Industrial Research and Fisheries after George E. de Silva was unseated by an election petition.

Sittampalam was re-elected at the May 1952 parliamentary election but lost his cabinet position. He was defeated at the 1956 parliamentary election by the Illankai Tamil Arasu Kachchi (Federal Party) candidate V. A. Alegacone.

Sittampalam died on 3 February 1964. In February 2004 Sri Lanka Post issued a commemorative stamp of Sittampalam.

See also
 List of political families in Sri Lanka

References

1898 births
1964 deaths
Alumni of Jaffna Central College
Alumni of Peterhouse, Cambridge
Alumni of Royal College, Colombo
Ceylonese advocates
Fisheries ministers of Sri Lanka
Industries ministers of Sri Lanka
Members of the 1st Parliament of Ceylon
Members of the 2nd Parliament of Ceylon
Members of the Middle Temple
People from Northern Province, Sri Lanka
People from British Ceylon
Posts ministers of Sri Lanka
Sri Lankan Tamil civil servants
Sri Lankan Tamil lawyers
Sri Lankan Tamil politicians
Telecommunication ministers of Sri Lanka